János Rovnyai (born 28 June 1951) is a Hungarian wrestler. He competed in the men's Greco-Roman +100 kg at the 1976 Summer Olympics.

References

External links
 

1951 births
Living people
Hungarian male sport wrestlers
Olympic wrestlers of Hungary
Wrestlers at the 1976 Summer Olympics
Sportspeople from Pest County